List of Great British Menu chefs may refer to:

 List of Great British Menu chefs (series 1–4)
 List of Great British Menu chefs (series 5–7)
 List of Great British Menu chefs (series 8–11)
 List of Great British Menu chefs (series 12–14)
 List of Great British Menu chefs (series 15–present)

See also
 Great British Menu, a British television cooking competition series